The Ectasian Period (from , meaning "extension") is the second geologic period in the Mesoproterozoic Era and lasted from  Mya ago to  Mya (million years ago). Instead of being based on stratigraphy, these dates are defined chronometrically.

Geologically the name refers to the continued expansion of platform covers during this period.

This period is interesting for the first evidence of sexual reproduction. The 1.2 billion years old Hunting Formation on Somerset Island, Canada, dates from the end of the Ectasian. It contains the microfossils of the multicellular filaments of Bangiomorpha pubescens (type of red algae), the first taxonomically resolved eukaryote. This was the first organism that exhibited sexual reproduction, which is an essential feature for complex multicellularity. Complex multicellularity is different from "simple" multicellularity, such as colonies of organisms living together. True multicellular organisms contain cells that are specialized for different functions. This is, in fact, an essential feature of sexual reproduction as well, since the male and female gametes are specialized cells. Organisms that reproduce sexually must solve the problem of generating an entire organism from just the germ cells.

Sexual reproduction and the ability of gametes to develop into an organism are the necessary antecedents to true multicellularity. In fact, we tend to think of sexual reproduction and true multicellularity as occurring at the same time, and true multicellularity is often taken as a marker for sexual reproduction.

See also

References
 

Mesoproterozoic
Geological periods
Proterozoic geochronology